Aliens is the first EP by Australian rock band Mondo Rock. It was released in 1987. It peaked at number 66 on the Kent Music Report.

Track listing

Cassette track listing 
A cassette was released featuring two additional tracks.

Personnel
Mondo Rock:
Ross Wilson – vocals, harmonica
Eric McCusker – guitar, backing vocals
Duncan Veall – keyboards, backing vocals
Andrew Ross – keyboards, saxophone, backing vocals
James Gilland – bass, backing vocals
John James Hackett – drums, percussion, guitar, backing vocals

Production team:
For all tracks except "Boom Baby Boom" and "Primitive Love Rites":
Producer – Mondo Rock and Chris Corr
Mixed By – Mark Opitz with Chris Corr (tracks 1, 2, 3); Chris Corr with Ross Wilson (tracks 5, 6)

For "Boom Baby Boom" and "Primitive Love Rites":
Producer, Engineer, Mixed in L.A. by – Bill Drescher

Charts

References 

Mondo Rock albums
1987 EPs
EPs by Australian artists
PolyGram EPs